Punta Arenas (historically known as Sandy Point in English) is the capital city of Chile's southernmost region, Magallanes and Antarctica Chilena. Although officially renamed as Magallanes in 1927, the name was changed back to Punta Arenas in 1938. The city is the largest south of the 46th parallel south and the most populous southernmost city in Chile and the Americas. Due to its location, it is also the coldest coastal city with more than 100,000 inhabitants in Latin America. Punta Arenas is one of the world's most southerly ports and serves as an Antarctic gateway city.

Since 1977, Punta Arenas has been one of only two free ports in Chile, the other being Iquique in the country's far north. Located on the Brunswick Peninsula north of the Strait of Magellan, Punta Arenas was originally established by the Chilean government in 1848 as a small penal colony to assert sovereignty over the Strait. During the remainder of the 1800s, Punta Arenas grew in size and importance due to the increasing maritime traffic and trade travelling to the west coasts of South and North America. This city's growth was also due to waves of European immigrants, mainly from Croatia and Russia, attracted by a gold rush and sheep farming boom in the 1880s and early 1900s. The largest sheep company, which controlled 10,000 square kilometres in Chile and Argentina, was based in Punta Arenas, and its owners lived there.

Since its founding, Chile has used Punta Arenas as a base to defend its sovereignty claims in the southernmost part of South America. This led to the Strait of Magellan being recognized as Chilean territory in the Boundary treaty of 1881 between Chile and Argentina. Punta Arenas' geopolitical importance has remained high in the 20th and 21st centuries due to its logistic significance in accessing the Antarctic Peninsula.

Since 2017, the city and its region have been on their own time zone, using summer time throughout the year (UTC−3). The city is supplied with water from the San Juan River.

Etymology
The name Sandy Point derives from the voyage of John Narborough in 1669-1671. He wrote in his account:

The English 18th-century explorer John Byron is sometimes erroneously credited with naming this area.

It was not until 1843 that the government tried to establish a fort and settlement at Fuerte Bulnes. The name Punta Arenas was derived from the Spanish term Punta Arenosa, a literal translation of the English name "Sandy Point". The city has also been known as Magallanes. Today that term is normally used to describe the administrative region which includes the city.

Punta Arenas has been nicknamed "the city of the red roofs" for the red-painted metal roofs that characterized the city for many years. Since about 1970, the availability of other colours in protective finishes has resulted in greater variety in the characteristic metal roofs.

Geography
Located on the Brunswick Peninsula, Punta Arenas is among the largest cities in Patagonia. In 2012, it had a population of 127,454.

The Magallanes region is considered part of Chilean Patagonia. Magallanes is Spanish for Magellan, and was named after Ferdinand Magellan, the Portuguese explorer sailing for Spain. While circumnavigating the earth for Spain, he passed close to the present site of Punta Arenas in 1520. Early English navigational documents referred to this site as "Sandy Point."

The city proper is located on the northeastern shore of Brunswick Peninsula. Except for the eastern shore, containing the settlements of Guairabo, Rio Amarillo and Punta San Juan, the peninsula is largely uninhabited. The municipality of Punta Arenas includes all of Brunswick Peninsula, as well as all islands west of the Isla Grande de Tierra del Fuego and north of Cockburn and Magdalena channels.

The largest of those are:
 Santa Inés Island
 Desolación Island
 Dawson Island
 Aracena Island
 Clarence Island
 Carlos Island
 Wickham Island

Except Dawson Island, which had a population of about 301 in 2002, the islands are largely uninhabited. Clarence Island had a population of five.

Climate

Due to its far southern latitude, Punta Arenas has a subpolar oceanic climate (Köppen climate classification Cfc) bordering on a tundra climate.
It is known for stable constant temperatures, which vary only slightly with the seasons. Rainfall is highest in April and May, and the snowy season runs all through the Chilean winter (June until September). As in most of Patagonia, average annual precipitation is quite low, only  because of a rain shadow created by the Andes. The average temperature does not go below . The city is also known for its strong winds (up to ), which are strongest during the summer. City officials have put up ropes between buildings in the downtown area to assist pedestrians with managing the strong downdrafts.

Since 1986, Punta Arenas has been the first significantly populated city in the world to be affected directly by the thinning ozone layer. Its residents are considered to be exposed to potentially damaging levels of ultraviolet radiation.

History

Two early Spanish settlements were attempted along this coast (on the Straits of Magellan). The first was founded in 1584 and was called Nombre de Jesús. It failed due to the harsh weather and difficulty in the settlers' obtaining food and water, and the enormous distances from other Spanish ports. A second colony, Ciudad del Rey don Felipe, was attempted about 80 kilometres south of Punta Arenas. This became known later as Puerto del Hambre, which translates to Port Famine. Spain had established these settlements in an attempt to protect its shipping and prevent piracy by English pirates, by controlling the Straits of Magellan. An English pirate captain, Thomas Cavendish during his circumnavigation, rescued the last surviving member of Puerto del Hambre in 1587.

Penal colony

In 1843 the Chilean government sent an expedition to build a fort and establish a permanent settlement on the shores of the Strait of Magellan. It built and commissioned a schooner called Goleta Ancud. Under the command of John Williams Wilson, Chilean Navy, it transported a crew of 21 people (captain, eighteen crew, and two women), plus cargo, to accomplish the mandate. The founding act of the settlement took place on 21 September 1843.

The fort was well-positioned on a small rocky peninsula, but the location could not support a proper civilian settlement. With this in mind the Military Governor, José de los Santos Mardones, decided in 1848 to move the settlement to its current location, along the Las Minas river, and renamed it Punta Arenas.

In the mid-19th century, Chile used Punta Arenas as a penal colony and a disciplinary posting for military personnel with "problematic" behaviour. It also settled immigrants there. In December 1851, a prisoners' mutiny led by Lieutenant Cambiaso, resulted in the murder of Governor Muñoz Gamero and the priest, and the destruction of the church and the hospital. The mutiny was put down by Commander Stewart of  assisted by two Chilean ships: Indefatigable and Meteoro.

In 1867, President José Joaquín Pérez issued a decree offering land grants in an effort to get Chileans or foreigners to settle around Punta Arenas.  The first British immigrants arrived in 1867, and their number increased as sheep farming grew in the Chilean Magallanes.  The greatest immigration continued to be by the British until 1906, when Croatians surpassed them in numbers.

An 1877 mutiny, known as El motín de los artilleros (Mutiny of the Artillerymen), led to the destruction of a large part of the town and the murder of many civilians not directly associated with the prison. In time the city was restored. The growth of the sheep farming industry and the discovery of gold, as well as increasing trade via sailing ships, attracted many new settlers, and the town began to prosper.

Economic boom
In 1910, Sociedad Explotadora merged with Sociedad Ganader, resulting in a company possessing 3 million hectares in southern Chile and Argentina, with over 2 million head of sheep. The headquarters of this company and the residences of the owners were in Punta Arenas. The Sarah Braun Museum is now established at the former Braun-Menéndez mansion, in the centre of Punta Arenas.

The Punta Arenas harbour, although exposed to storms, was considered one of the most important in Chile before the construction of the Panama Canal. It was used as a coaling station by the steamships transiting between the Atlantic and Pacific oceans. Today it is mostly used by tourism cruises and scientific expeditions.

Modern city
The city is often a base for Antarctic expeditions; Ushuaia (Argentina) and Christchurch (New Zealand) are also common starting points.

Demography

In 2012 Punta Arenas recorded a population of over 127,000 inhabitants for the (2012 Census) by the National Statistics Institute. The population grew by 5.1% (5,830 persons) between the 1992 and 2002 censuses and further rose to 127,454 at the 2012 Census.

The city was populated by many colonists from Spain and Croatia in the mid-nineteenth century, and many of their descendants remain. Other national ethnic groups represented are German, English, Italian, Swiss and Irish.

Croatian immigration to Punta Arenas was a crucial development in the region of Magallanes and the city in particular. Currently, this influence is still reflected in the names of shops, streets and many buildings. Punta Arenas is said to have the largest percentage of Croatians in the world outside Croatia and the former Yugoslavia.

Punta Arenas also has the largest percentage of residents of British descent in the whole Chile. 

Punta Arenas is home to the southernmost Hindu temple in the world, which is used by the relatively small, but significant, Sindhi community in Punta Arenas. Sindhi merchants began arriving in the area during the early 1900s, and today constitute one of the largest communities of Indians in Chile.

Economy

By 2006 the economy of Punta Arenas and the region had diversified. Chile's principal oil reserves are close by, along with some low-grade coal.

Agricultural production, including sheep and cattle, continues to play a significant role.

Tourism has contributed to the city's economy and steady growth. Tourist destinations include the Cathedral and other notable churches, the city cemetery, and the statue of Magellan. Some cruise ships to Antarctica depart from Punta Arenas's port, which also serves as a hub for many cruise lines that travel along the channels and fjords of the region.

A scheduled ferry service connects Punta Arenas with the main island of Tierra del Fuego, and a less frequent ferry runs to the Chilean town of Puerto Williams.

Education

University of Magallanes (UMAG) is in the southern Chilean city of Punta Arenas. It is part of the Chilean Traditional Universities. The University of Magallanes was established in 1981 during the neoliberal reforms of Chile's military regime as the successor of Universidad Técnica del Estado's Punta Arenas section. Universidad Técnica del Estado had established the Punta Arenas section in 1961.

The University of Magallanes has campuses in Punta Arenas and Puerto Natales as well as a university centre in Puerto Williams. University of Magallanes publishes the humanities and social sciences journal Magallania twice a year.

There is a German school, Deutsche Schule Punta Arenas.

Culture

Nao Victoria Museum 

This museum exhibits a full-size replica of the first ship ever to circumnavigate the world: Ferdinand Magellan's Nao Victoria. Since October 2011, the museum has added a full-size replica of the James Caird, used by Ernest Shackleton during his Imperial Trans-Antarctic Expedition with the Endurance. The museum is located 7.5 km north on Route Y-565 to Rio Seco.

Administration
As a "comuna" (commune) Punta Arenas is a third-level administrative division of Chile administered by a municipal council, headed by an alcalde who is directly elected every four years. The 2016–2020 alcalde is Claudio Radonich (National Renewal).

Within the electoral divisions of Chile, Punta Arenas is represented in the Chamber of Deputies by Sandra Amar (UDI), Karim Bianchi (IND-PRSD) and Gabriel Boric (CS) as part of the 60th electoral district, which includes the entire Magallanes and Antartica Chilena Region. The commune is represented in the Senate by Carlos Bianchi Chelech (Ind.) and Carolina Goic B. (DC) as part of the 19th senatorial constituency (Magallanes Region).

Transportation

Carlos Ibáñez del Campo airport is located 20 kilometers from the city centre. Rental car services, duty-free shops and custom office services are available in the building (there is no duty-free shop in the terminal, despite the representations of tourist literature). Airlines serving the airport include LATAM Chile and Sky Airline, as well as charter flights.  The civilian airport and the military airport make up the larger complex.

The city has sea, land, and air connections. By road, a connection to other regions of Chile requires passing through Argentine territory. By sea, several cruises and ferries can take visitors to the city, although the costs are higher because they include stops at tourist sites along the route.

Notable people
 Gabriel Boric (1986–), President of Chile (2022–)
 Sara Braun (1862–1955), businesswoman 
 Marina Latorre (1925–), writer, journalist and gallerist
 Juan Marino Cabello (1920–2007), composer, writer, screenwriter, bandleader and lyricist
 Mateo Martinic, historian and writer
 Mariana Cox Méndez (1871–1914), writer, feminist
 Julio Milostich (1966–), actor

Twin towns – sister cities
Punta Arenas is twinned with:
 Bellingham, United States
 Harbin, China
 Río Gallegos, Argentina

 Ushuaia, Argentina

See also
 1949 Tierra del Fuego earthquake
 Croatian Chilean
 Immigration to Chile
 Southernmost settlements

Notes

References

External links

 portal de la ciudad
 Portal de la Ciudad
 Municipalidad de Punta Arenas
 La Prensa Austral
 Satellite picture by Google Maps

 
Port cities in Chile
Capitals of Chilean regions
Communes of Chile
Populated places established in 1848
Capitals of Chilean provinces
Populated places in Magallanes Province
Strait of Magellan
Former penal colonies
Populated places in the Strait of Magellan
1848 establishments in South America
Brunswick Peninsula